Keith Kyle (4 August 1925, Sturminster Newton, Dorset – 21 February 2007, London) was a British writer, broadcaster and historian.

Early life
Kyle was educated at Bromsgrove School and Magdalen College, Oxford University, where his period as an undergraduate was broken by war service.

Career
He worked for the BBC North American Service as a talks producer, succeeding Tony Benn in 1951. In 1953, he joined The Economist and was sent to Washington; later he was reporter for the BBC's Tonight programme from 1960, specialising in coverage of Africa and based in Nairobi. He also contributed to The Observer and The Spectator at this time, and covered Rhodesia in the period before the Smith government's UDI.

From the late 1960s, Kyle began an academic career, while remaining active as a journalist for some years. He was a Fellow of the John F Kennedy Institute of Politics at Harvard (1967–68) and joined Chatham House in 1972, where he remained for 30 years. In the late 1980s, St Antony's College, Oxford invited him to become an associate member. His history, Suez: Britain's End of Empire in the Middle East (Weidenfeld & Nicolson) first appeared in 1991, and is regarded as definitive in almost all the cited articles. His other books include The Politics of the Independence of Kenya (Macmillan) in 1999 and his posthumous autobiography Keith Kyle: Reporting the World appeared in June 2009, published by I.B.Tauris.

Parliamentary candidacies
Kyle had a chequered career as a parliamentary candidate. He had hoped to become a Conservative candidate in 1956, but government policy on Suez dissuaded him. He was an unsuccessful Labour Party candidate in St Albans in 1966, for Braintree in both 1974 elections and was the Northampton South SDP candidate in 1983.

References

External links
 

British male journalists
People educated at Bromsgrove School
People from Sturminster Newton
1925 births
2007 deaths
20th-century English historians
Chatham House people
Social Democratic Party (UK) parliamentary candidates
Labour Party (UK) parliamentary candidates